Vexillum cithara, common name the harp mitre, is a species of small sea snail, marine gastropod mollusk in the family Costellariidae, the ribbed miters.

Description
The length of the shell attains 13 mm.

(Original description)The ovate shell is rather thick. The sutures are impressed. The shell is longitudinally very closely ribbed with narrow ribs. The shell is obtuse. The interstices are transversely latticed. The shell has a purple lead-colour, encircled with a narrow pale zone. The columella is four-plaited.

Distribution
This marine species occurs off the Solomon Islands

References

External links
 Sowerby, G. B. II. (1874). Monograph of the genus Mitra. In G. B. Sowerby II (ed.), Thesaurus conchyliorum, or monographs of genera of shells. Vol. 4 (31-32): 1–46, pls 352–379
 Melvill, J.C. & Sykes, E.R. (1899). Notes on a third collection of marine shells from the Andaman Islands, with descriptions of three new species of Mitra. Proceedings of the Malacological Society of London. 3: 220–229.

cithara
Gastropods described in 1845